Walter Atherton was an English footballer. His only known club was Blackpool, for whom he made thirteen Football League appearances in 1898.

References

Year of birth missing
Year of death missing
English footballers
Blackpool F.C. players
Association football wing halves